DigitalMania is the first independent video game developer studio in Tunisia. Founded in 2012 by Walid Sultan Midani, the actual CEO, DigitalMania is specialized in the development of multiplatform games (Facebook, iOS, Android,...).

Games 
 Defendoor (2012)
 Tunis 2050 (2013)
 Malla J3ala (2014)
 Slap Mosquitoes (2014)
 Boga Bubbles (2014)
 Funky Shooter (2015)
 Beat The Beats (2015)

Prizes 
 Media & IT Award by Maghreb Startup Initiative (2012)
 Best Performing Startup by Microsoft (2012)
 Selected Startup by Europe4Startups (2013)
 USSD Representative : GES 2013 Kualalumpur (2013)
 Best Startup of the PITME Program (2014)
Winner of the Business Creative Cup Tunisia 2015 (2015)

References

External links 
 

Mobile game companies
Video game companies established in 2012
Video game companies of Tunisia
2012 establishments in Tunisia
Video game development companies